Mayo-Banyo  is a department of Adamawa Province in Cameroon.
The department covers an area of 8,520 km and as of 2001 had a total population of 134,902. The capital of the department lies at Banyo.

Subdivisions
The department is divided administratively into arrondissements and communes and in turn into villages.

 Bankim
 Banyo
 Mayo-Darlé

References

Departments of Cameroon
Adamawa Region